José Macaia Ganga best known as Macaia (born March 24, 1994) is an Angolan footballer who plays as a midfielder for Clube Primeiro de Agosto.

References

External links 
 

1994 births
Living people
Association football midfielders
Angolan footballers
Angola international footballers
C.D. Primeiro de Agosto players
S.L. Benfica (Luanda) players
Sporting Clube de Cabinda players
Sportspeople from Cabinda Province
2019 Africa Cup of Nations players
People from Cabinda (city)